Kunming South railway station is the main high-speed rail station of the Kunming metropolitan area. It is the western terminus of the Nanning–Kunming High-Speed Railway and the Shanghai–Kunming High-Speed Railway.

The station put into operation in December 2016 after five years of construction. The same year, the station was connected to the Kunming Metro network via a branch of Line 1.

The station is located in the Chenggong District of the City of Kunming, the capital of Yunnan Province. It was put into operation simultaneously with the two high-speed mainlines it serves, after five years of construction. It is also the terminal for the high-speed (D series) trains on the Kunming–Yuxi Railway.

Although Chenggong is being developed as Kunming's new city center, it is about 20 km from Kunming's current city center. Its remote location causes some complaints from city's residents. There are plans to link Kunming South railway station with Kunming railway station (located just south of the city center) by the end of 2017, enabling high-speed trains to serve Kunming railway station as well.

References

Railway stations in Yunnan
Railway stations in China opened in 2016
Transport in Kunming